Reserve League (Arabic: دوري الرديف) was a promotion-ineligible reserve teams league in Qatar which had 12 teams and operated between 2009 - 2014. After that, the competition dissolved and merged with Qatargas League and become one competition with 18 teams.

Championship history 

2009-10: Al-Arabi SC
2010-11: Al Sadd SC
2011-12: Al Sadd SC
2012-13: Al Sadd SC
2013-14: Al Sadd SC

Football leagues in Qatar
Qatar